Mike Agbedor Abu Ozekhome (born on October 15, 1957 in Iviukwe, Agenebode in Edo State, Nigeria) is a lawyer and human rights activist, holding the rank of a Senior Advocate of Nigeria. He is known for his work as a constitutional lawyer and also an orator.

Education 
Mike Agbedor Abu Ozekhome obtained his Bachelor of Laws degree (LL.B.) from the Obafemi Awolowo University, Ile-Ife (at the time, known as the University of Ife), graduating in 1980. He then attended the Nigerian Law School, Victoria Island Lagos (1981). Former chief Kanmi-Isola Osobu served as his pupil advisor following his admittance to the Nigerian Bar in July, 1981. Thereafter, he returned to Obafemi Awolowo University to earn his Master of Laws (LL.M.), receiving the degree in 1983.

Career 
Prior to earning his LL.M., Ozekhome was posted to the Ministry of Justice, Yola as a member of the National Youth Service Corps (NYSC) and then to the Federal Ministry of Justice, Lagos State. From there, he served as state counsel for the National Provident Fund (now Nigerian Social Insurance and Trust Fund (NSITF).

He then joined the chambers of  the activist human rights lawyer and social crusader, the late Chief Gani Fawehinmi, where he gradually rose to become the Deputy Head of Chambers, a position he held till 1985. He founded his own multi-office firm, Mike Ozekhome's Chambers, in 1986. In  2010, he was one of 19 senior legal practitioners conferred with the rank of Senior Advocate of Nigeria.

Kidnap and release
Ozekhome was randomly kidnapped on the Benin-Auchi motorway on 23 August 2013 and held for ransom. Four policemen responding in an effort to thwart the kidnapping were killed. The kidnapping garnered considerable media attention. Held along with approximately a dozen others in what he described as a well-organized camp, Ozekhome was released after several weeks when ransom was negotiated with the kidnappers, returning home on 12 September 2013. On 25 September 2013, wanted criminal Kelvin Prosper Oniarah was arrested by a combined security team of the Nigerian Army and DSS operatives for the kidnapping.

References

Living people
1957 births
Nigerian activists
Nigerian human rights activists
Obafemi Awolowo University alumni
Nigerian Law School alumni
People from Edo State